The Battle of Espinosa de los Monteros was a battle of the Napoleonic Wars, fought on 10 and 11 November 1808 at the village of Espinosa de los Monteros in the Cantabrian Mountains. It resulted in a French victory under General Victor against Lieutenant General Joaquín Blake's Army of Galicia.

Background
The Dos de Mayo Uprising had put Iberia in revolt against French rule. The Spanish conventional warfare had started at El Bruch (June 1808), while the Battle of Bailen (July 1808) marked the first open-field defeat of a Napoleonic army. British intervention had started at Roliça (August 1808), and Napoleon's personal participation in the invasion of Spain started with the engagement of Joaquín Blake's forces at Zornoza.

Battle 
Victor launched a series of attacks on the first day that were thrown back with heavy losses by the disciplined regulars of General La Romana's Division of the North. By nightfall, Blake's positions still held. On the morning of 11 November, Victor regained his composure and coordinated a massive French attack that pierced Blake's left wing and drove the Spaniards from the field.

Blake led his remaining men through a heroic retreat west through the mountains to escape Soult's pursuit. However, when Blake arrived at León on 23 November, only 20,000 of his men remained, in an extremely bad condition.

Aftermath
Napoleon's invasion of Spain proceeded with the Battle of Tudela.

In popular culture
The Gun, by C. S. Forester (author of the Horatio Hornblower series), begins with the Spanish retreat from Espinoza.

References

Bibliography

External links
 }

Battle of Espinosa
Battles of the Peninsular War
Battles involving Spain
Battles involving France
Battle of Espinosa
November 1808 events
History of the province of Burgos
Battles inscribed on the Arc de Triomphe